James Ephraim McGirt (1874-1930) was  poet, publisher, and businessman in the United States. He was from North Carolina and published his poetry. He started McGirt's Magazine which he published for six years before moving on to a career as a businessman and real estate developer.

He graduated from Bennett College.

References

Poets from North Carolina

1874 births
1930 deaths
Bennett College alumni